Red-Headed Baby is a 1931 Warner Bros. Merrie Melodies cartoon directed by Rudolf Ising. The short was released on December 26, 1931.

The short is the first in the Looney Tunes and Merrie Melodies series to not feature a recurring character; all previous cartoons had featured Bosko, Foxy or Piggy.

Plot
Around Christmas Eve, a toymaker creates a red-haired doll, who, after he (the toymaker) departs, comes to life along with the other toys; she subsequently breaks into singing the titular song, in the process meeting a toy soldier (given the name 'Napoleon') who instantly falls for her.

However, a massive and thuggish spider also has fallen for the doll. He kidnaps her and beats the sawdust out of Napoleon. Napoleon fills his body up again and defeats the spider using a toy train. All the toys rejoice and the doll and Napoleon reunite as the titular song reprises, ending the cartoon.

References

External links
 
 

1931 films
1931 animated films
Films scored by Frank Marsales
Films about spiders
Films directed by Rudolf Ising
Merrie Melodies short films
Warner Bros. Cartoons animated short films
Films about sentient toys
American black-and-white films
1930s Warner Bros. animated short films